Jarreh-ye Olya (also Romanized as Jarreh-ye ‘Olyā; also known as Jarrah-e Bālā and Jarreh-ye Bālā) is a village in Vahdatiyeh Rural District, Sadabad District, Dashtestan County, Bushehr Province, Iran. At the 2006 census, its population was 28, in 8 families.

References 

Populated places in Dashtestan County